Age appropriateness refers to people behaving as predicted by their perspective timetable of development. The perspective timetable is embedded throughout people's social life, primarily based on socially-agreed age expectations and age norms. For a given behavior, such as marrying, entering school, etc., there are years within which the behavior is regarded appropriate. By contrast, if the behavior falls out of the age range, it will be considered age-inappropriate. Most people are adhered to these age norms and are aware of whether their timing is "early," "delayed," or "on time."

Age appropriateness is considered essential for children's skills development. Children's motor, cognitive and social skills are formed through several development stages. Looking at a child's functional development involves observing whether or not the child has mastered certain developmental milestones and expectations for his or her age. Lack of exposure to age-appropriate activities and experiences in a specific stage is thought to prevent a child from gaining the skills necessary for their current and thus their next stage of development.

There are various sanctions associated with age inappropriateness, ranging from social isolation, damage to physical health and cognitive development, and forming of improper behaviour.

Social participation

Application 
Age-appropriate social skills and communication with peers can be interpreted in terms of cause and effect. Insufficient sets of age-appropriate social skills result in difficulty establishing social relations, and lack of social ties can worsen the underdeveloped set of social skills.

Students prefer to associate with those similar to them in various dimensions, such as age, gender, race, educational attainment, values, interests and/or beliefs, etc. This phenomenon is termed homophily. Therefore, normal students with age-appropriate social skills are more likely to gather together, building up friendships and cohesive groups within peers.

Sanctions of age-inappropriateness 
Students with special needs, especially those with autism spectrum disorders and serious behavioural disorders, experience severe obstacles in social participation, which involves building up friendships or relationships, contacts or interactions, social self-perception, and being accepted by classmates.

These experiences of segregation in the early school years may threaten children's social development directly. Their lack of contact with peers, underdevelopment of age-appropriate social skills, and negative self-concepts result in externalizing, such as aggression, and internalizing problems, such as anxiety.

School entry

Applications 
School is an institute designed to provide students with learning spaces and environments under the guidance of teachers, where students lay the foundation and get prepared for future skill development. Therefore, it is vital that children enter school at an appropriate age.

Some students are older-within-cohort, which means they fall outside their cohort's standard 12-month age range, either because they are forced to hold back or voluntarily postpone the entry. Forced grade retention occurs because students fail to catch up with peers or their families fail to support their studies. Voluntary late access to school is termed "academic redshirting." Redshirting happens among students who have a relatively late birthday just before the cutoff date (September 30) or those considered relatively immature for school. Both forced and voluntary retention aims to spare time for the students to catch up or get prepared.

There are four views comparing the strengths and weaknesses of delayed and on-time entry.
 The nativist view states that children should be adequately mature when entering school. 
 The environmental view holds that children's readiness for school is evaluated by the amount of common knowledge they have.
 The social constructivist view states that school readiness depends on individual, social, and cultural backgrounds.
 The interactionist view considers readiness as bi-directional, regarding both students' readiness and the capacity of the school to meet the child's needs.

The nativist and social constructivist stand for retention since they believe it prepares children for school, predicting better academic performance. On the other hand, the environmental and interactionist views are often the basis for on-time schooling because it is age-appropriate for children to do so, and school will accommodate variations in students.

Sanctions of age-inappropriateness 
Research has shown that retention or "redshirting" generates few academic advantages. Though delayed entry could generate statistically significant improvements in academic performance in the short run (usually in the first three years), the progress loses its significance in the long run. Long-term speaking, markedly older-for-cohort students were higher in school disengagement, lower in positive intentions, lower in homework completion, and lower in performance scores. These findings stand for environmental and interactionist views, enhancing the importance of age appropriateness in children's development.

Playing

Application 
It is crucial that parents select appropriate toys for children to aid their development and ensure their safety. Various guidelines have been published to ensure toy safety, such as U.S. Consumer Product Safety Commission (CPSC) in the US, Guidance on Toy Safety by EU Commission, etc.

Importance of age-appropriateness 
Research has shown that appropriate playing enhances children's development in 4 dimensions:

 physical development
 cognitive development (creativity, discovery, language skills, verbal judgment and reasoning, symbolic thought, problem-solving skills, and the ability to focus and control behaviour),
 emotional development (awareness, sensitivity to others, emotional strength and stability, spontaneity, humour, and feelings about self)
 social development (social learning)

These toys match with children's current developmental skills and abilities, further encouraging the development of new skills.

In determining toy safety, the toy's characteristics, how the toy might be used or abused, and the amount of supervision needed for playing safely should be considered. Typical risky toys may include high-powered magnetic objects, toys with small parts that could cause a potentially fatal choking hazard, etc.

Exposure to media

Application 
Various content rating systems have been developed to prevent the harm that age-inappropriate media presentations bring to children. The two main categories of rating are the evaluating rating system based on age appropriateness and the descriptive rating system based on the content description.

Examples of evaluating rating systems include the Canadian Home Video Rating System, Korea Media Rating Board, the Movie and Television Review and Classification Board of the Philippines, the Office of Film and Literature Classification (New Zealand), the British Board of Film Classification, the Australian Classification Board, and the Film Classification and Rating Organization (Eirin) of Japan.

Sanctions of age-inappropriateness 
Meta-analyses have shown that exposure to media violence promotes aggressive behaviour, increases acceptance of violence and hostility, and results in antisocial outcomes. Also, research shows that pornographic and mainstream erotic materials encourage sexual callousness, cynical attitudes about love and marriage, and perceptions that promiscuity is normal. The negative effects on the brain and within relationships will be highly intensified when sexual content is combined with violent content.

See also
Adultism
Ageism
Elsagate
Family-friendly
Lie-to-children
Status offense
Children's Online Privacy Protection Act

References

External links 
 Toys safety guidance by U.S. Consumer Product Safety Commission(CPSC)
 Guidance on Toy Safety by EU Commission
 Canadian Home Video Rating System
 Office of Film and Literature Classification (New Zealand)
 British Board of Film Classification
 Australian Classification Board
 Film Classification and Rating Organization

Child development
Educational stages
Educational psychology
Ageism
Child safety